Axel Hermann Thieme (born 15 May 1939; died 17 March 2006 in Leipzig) is a German former field hockey player who competed at the 1964 Summer Olympics and the 1968 Summer Olympics. He was born in Leipzig, Saxony, Germany.

Olympic events 
1964 Summer Olympics in Tokyo, competing for the United Team of Germany:
 Men's field hockey – 5th place

1968 Summer Olympics in Mexico City, competing for East Germany:
 Men's field hockey – 11th place

References

External links
 

1939 births
2006 deaths
German male field hockey players
Field hockey players at the 1964 Summer Olympics
Field hockey players at the 1968 Summer Olympics
Olympic field hockey players of the United Team of Germany
Olympic field hockey players of East Germany
Sportspeople from Leipzig